The 1834–35 United States Senate elections were held on various dates in various states. As these U.S. Senate elections were prior to the ratification of the Seventeenth Amendment in 1913, senators were chosen by state legislatures. Senators were elected over a wide range of time throughout 1834 and 1835, and a seat may have been filled months late or remained vacant due to legislative deadlock. In these elections, terms were up for the senators in Class 2.

The Anti-Jackson coalition maintained control of the Senate. However, during the 24th Congress, the Jacksonian coalition gained control of the Senate.

Results summary 
Senate party division, 24th Congress (1835–1837)

 Majority party: Jacksonian (21–31)
 Minority party: Anti-Jackson (24–19)
 Other parties: Nullifier (2)
 Total seats: 48–52

Change in composition

Before the elections

Result of the regular elections

Race summaries

Special elections during the 23rd Congress 
In these special elections, the winners were seated during 1834 or before March 4, 1835; ordered by election date.

Races leading to the 24th Congress 
In these regular elections, the winner was seated on March 4, 1835; ordered by state.

All of the elections involved the Class 2 seats.

Special election during the 24th Congress 
In this special election, the winner was seated in 1835 after March 4; ordered by election date.

Early elections during the 24th Congress 
In these elections, the winners were not seated until 1837.

Alabama

Connecticut (special)

Delaware

Georgia 

Georgia had two elections this cycle: a regular election for the class 2 seat and a special election for the class 3 seat.

Georgia (regular) 

In the class 2 seat, incumbent Jacksonian John Pendleton King, who had served since winning an 1833 special election, was re-elected sometime in 1834.

Georgia (special) 

In the class 3 seat, incumbent Jacksonian John Forsyth, who had served since winning an 1829 special election, resigned June 27, 1834, to become U.S. Minister to Spain.

Jacksonian Alfred Cuthbert was elected January 12, 1835.

Illinois

Kentucky

Louisiana

Maine 

Maine had two elections this cycle, both for the class 2 seat.

Incumbent Anti-Jacksonian Peleg Sprague, who was elected in 1829, resigned January 1, 1835.

Jacksonian John Ruggles won both elections.

Maine (regular) 

Jacksonian John Ruggles was elected January 19, 1835, to the next term.  He was then elected to finish the current term, see below.

Maine (special) 

Jacksonian John Ruggles was elected January 20, 1835, to finish the term that would end March 3, 1835.

Maryland (special) 

Ezekiel F. Chambers won election over non-voters by a margin of 63.10%, or 53 votes, for the Class 3 seat.

Massachusetts

Michigan 

The new state of Michigan elected its new senators in 1835, both Jacksonians: Lucius Lyon (Class 1) and John Norvell (Class 2).  They were not seated until January 26, 1837, due to a territorial dispute with Ohio.

Mississippi

New Hampshire

New Jersey

North Carolina

Pennsylvania (special)

Rhode Island

South Carolina

Tennessee

Virginia 

Virginia had two elections this cycle, both for the class 2 seat.

Incumbent Jacksonian William Rives, who had just won the 1832 special election, resigned February 22, 1834.

Anti-Jacksonian Benjamin W. Leigh won both elections.

Virginia (regular) 

Anti-Jacksonian Benjamin W. Leigh was re-elected sometime in 1835 to the next term.

Virginia (special) 

Anti-Jacksonian Benjamin W. Leigh was elected February 26, 1834, to finish the term that would end March 3, 1835.  He was then elected to the next term, see above.

See also 
 1834 United States elections
 1834–35 United States House of Representatives elections
 23rd United States Congress
 24th United States Congress

Notes

References

Sources 
 Party Division in the Senate, 1789-Present, via Senate.gov